Anna Javorková (born 8 October 1952) is a Slovak actress. Javorková studied at the Academy of Performing Arts in Bratislava (VŠMU), joining the Slovak National Theatre in 1974. At the 2013 DOSKY Awards she won in the category of Best Actress, for her performances as Clytemnestra in the play Oresteia at the Slovak National Theatre in Bratislava.

Selected filmography 
One Silver Piece (1976)
Mesto tieňov (television, 2008)
Odsúdené (television, 2009)
Rex (television, 2017)

References

External links

1952 births
Living people
Slovak stage actresses
Slovak film actresses
Slovak television actresses
People from Ružomberok
20th-century Slovak actresses
21st-century Slovak actresses